Konrad Laimer (born 27 May 1997) is an Austrian professional footballer who plays as a midfielder for Bundesliga club RB Leipzig and the Austria national team.

Club career
Laimer is a youth exponent from Red Bull Salzburg. He made his Erste Liga debut with the reserve team and breeder club Liefering in 2 May 2014, against SV Horn. He made his first team debut at 28 September 2014 against Rapid Wien. He replaced Alan in added time.

On 30 June 2017, Laimer moved to Germany and joined RB Leipzig on a four-year deal. Laimer's deal was due to run out in 2021, but he later signed a contract extension until 2023.

International career
Laimer got his first call up to the senior Austria side for 2018 FIFA World Cup qualifiers against Wales and Georgia in September 2017.

He made his debut on 7 June 2019 in a Euro 2020 qualifier against Slovenia, as a starter.

Career statistics

Club

International 

Scores and results list Austria's goal tally first, score column indicates score after each Laimer goal.

Honours
Red Bull Salzburg
Austrian Bundesliga: 2014–15, 2015–16, 2016–17
Austrian Cup: 2014–15, 2015–16, 2016–17

RB Leipzig
DFB-Pokal: 2021–22

Individual
UEFA Europa League Team of the Season: 2021–22

References

External links

Profile at the RB Leipzig website

Eurosport profile

1997 births
Living people
Footballers from Salzburg
Association football midfielders
Austrian footballers
Austria youth international footballers
Austria under-21 international footballers
Austria international footballers
FC Red Bull Salzburg players
RB Leipzig players
FC Liefering players
Austrian Football Bundesliga players
Bundesliga players
UEFA Euro 2020 players
Austrian expatriate footballers
Austrian expatriate sportspeople in Germany
Expatriate footballers in Germany